The 1985 Sudanese coup d'état was a military coup that occurred in Sudan on 6 April 1985. The coup was staged by a group of military officers and led by the Defense Minister and Armed Forces Commander-in-Chief, Field Marshal Abdel Rahman Swar al-Dahab, against the government of President Gaafar Nimeiry.

Background
In 1983, President Gaafar Nimeiry declared all Sudan an Islamic state under Sharia law, including the non-Islamic majority southern part of the country. The Southern Sudan Autonomous Region was abolished on 5 June 1983, terminating the Addis Ababa Agreement of 1972, which ended the First Sudanese Civil War. This move directly initiated the Second Sudanese Civil War in 1983.

Coup

The Sudanese Armed Forces took control of the country on 6 April 1985 after more than a week of civil unrest, caused by increasing food prices and growing dissatisfaction with the government of President Nimeiry, who himself came to power in the 1969 coup d'état. Nimeiry was in the United States at the time of the coup.

The coup was announced over the radio. The radio studios in Omdurman were heavily guarded by soldiers, who withdrew only after the announcement was made.

Reportedly, there were two casualties during the coup, killed in a brief shootout as soldiers seized the state security headquarters in the capital Khartoum.

Announcements from the new government
In a military communique read on the radio on 7 April, Dahab claimed the military had seized control of the country because of "the worsening situation and the political crisis, which worsens continuously".

In a later communique read on the Radio Omdurman, Dahab promised political, economic and social changes. He also guaranteed freedom for the press, political organizations and religious communities. In the same communique, Dahab also promised the opening of a "direct dialogue" with the rebels in the south (predominantly Christian and animist), and the achievement of national unity "within the framework of equality in rights and duties".

Dahab had issued a seven-point program which dismissed President Nimeiry and his government, suspended the Constitution and the Parliament (Central People's Assembly), dissolved the governing SSU party and declared a "temporary" state of emergency and martial law. Dahab said that the military had seized control of the country for a limited period of time, and that power would be returned "back to the people" within six months.

Reactions
Following the announcement of the coup, tens of thousands of people poured into the streets of Khartoum, celebrating the coup. They destroyed pictures of Nimeiry, including one in the reception area of the Khartoum Hilton Hotel.

Shortly after the coup, Nimeiry left Washington, D.C. and arrived in Cairo. He was met at the Cairo International Airport by senior Egyptian officials (President Hosni Mubarak, Prime Minister Kamal Hassan Ali and Defense Minister Field Marshal Abd Al-Halim Abu-Ghazala). Initially intending to try to return to Khartoum, Nimeiry had been dissuaded from doing that by the pilot of his Boeing 707 presidential jet and by Mubarak, on the grounds that the trip would be too dangerous.

While Egyptian officials said that they were "very concerned" about the situation, the new military government of Sudan was quickly recognized by the government of Libyan Arab Jamahiriya under Col. Muammar Gaddafi, a foe of pro-Western Nimeiry. 
Ba'athist Syria under the presidency of Hafez al-Assad also welcomed Nimeiry's ouster.

References

Military coups in Sudan
Coup d'etat
Sudanese coup d'etat
1980s coups d'état and coup attempts
April 1985 events in Africa